Pandit Deen Dayal Upadhayaya University of Health Sciences, Karnal is a university specialised in health sciences in Karnal, Haryana, India. It was established by Haryana Act No. 27 of 2016 and named University of Health Sciences, Karnal which was changed into Pandit Deen Dayal Upadhayaya University of Health Sciences, Karnal by an amendment act passed in 2018.

History
The concept of the University of Health Sciences at Kutail, Karnal, Haryana was introduced in 2016. After the Department of Medical Education and Research, Haryana proposed the idea of university at Kutail, the university was approved by Manohar Lal Khattar the  present Chief Minister of Haryana along with Haryana Cabinet. The announcement was made by Chief Minister while addressing the press at  Kalpana Chawla Government Medical College. Government of Haryana sought help of Bloomberg School of Public Health at Johns Hopkins University in the United States to set up the University of Health Sciences in Kutail, Karnal, Haryana.
The Kalpana Chawla Government Medical College is thus the mother institution of University of Health Sciences.

Campus
The  campus near Grand Trunk Road is located on the 99 years long land leased by the Kutail village at the rate of Rs 1 per acre to the Medical Education and Research Department, Haryana.

Admission
The university commenced running classes for the 44 BSc Nursing and 30BSc Physiotherapy students in November 2018, initially from the campus of the KCGMCH while the university buildings are being constructed.

See also

 Similar institutes
 All India Institutes of Medical Sciences
 AIIMS, Badsa (Jhajjar)
 Pandit Bhagwat Dayal Sharma Post Graduate Institute of Medical Sciences, Rohtak
 List of institutions of higher education in Haryana
 List of medical colleges in India
 Related health topics
 Healthcare in India
 Indian states ranking by institutional delivery
 List of hospitals in India

References

Medical and health sciences universities in India
Proposed organizations
Hospitals in Haryana
Medical colleges in Haryana
Teaching hospitals in India
Education in Karnal
Karnal
Universities in Haryana
2016 establishments in Haryana
Educational institutions established in 2016